David Z. Scheffel  was professor of anthropology at Thompson Rivers University in Kamloops, British Columbia, Canada.  Born in former Czechoslovakia in 1955, he emigrated in August 1968 after the Soviet invasion with his parents and sister to Austria. Scheffel earned degrees in Canada in anthropology, culminating in his doctorate from McMaster University in 1988.  His main areas of interest in the last couple of decades is ethnology studies of the Romani people in Europe. Scheffel is the author of numerous scholarly articles and books, including In the Shadow of Antichrist (Broadview Press, 1991), a work on the Russian Orthodox breakaway Old Believers sect in Alberta.

Scheffel's efforts to help impoverished Roma rebuild their community in the Slovakian village of Svinia is the subject of a 1998 documentary film, The Gypsies of Svinia. He is also the author of the 2005 study Svinia in Black and White: Slovak Roma and their Neighbours (University of Toronto Press).

Spurious charges

In June 2019, a Slovakian court in Prešov found David Scheffel guilty of sexual abuse and illegal weapon possession and sentenced him to seven years in prison.<ref>https://vancouversun.com/news/local-news/b-c-university-professor-gets-seven-year-sentence-in-slovakia , June 21, 2019. The verdict remains under appeal. It need be noted that the ‘weapon possession’ was for an antique single shot rifle inherited from family and displayed as a relic; it had no bullets and was unused.

An accredited and duly authorised academic, Professor David Scheffel had been:

    Engaged in legitimate and approved social research;  
    Arrested on spurious, fabricated charges after voluntarily visiting Slovakia from Canada for a clarification meeting with police; 
    Kept incarcerated November 2017 to September 2018 in conditions contrary to a multitude of international and domestic agreements, conventions and protocols related to arrests and imprisonment to which Slovakia is signatory but which had been disregarded (since that time his conditions have somewhat improved); 
    Denied, for many months, opportunity to gather evidence so as to prove his innocence by access to his records, photographs and recorded interviews; 
    Called –up to today—to 22 separate days in court, during which he consistently was able to provide proof of innocence via documents and personal testimonials of witnesses.

The above, with the continuance of detention, makes it seem like there is a real or instigated process to keep the truth of Professor Scheffel’s research from being revealed; yet if this process by the courts prevails, this can transform into a sustained, anti- human rights oriented judicial governance that would inevitably affect others as well.

This case is of special concern, not only for academic freedom, but for developing a better understanding of Romani issues, the reality of which may facilitate improved understanding of Romani populations and avail practical new ideas for alleviation of their desperate conditions. Slovakia could find itself in the forefront of social improvement processes for their largest minority.

Efforts in this case to gain the release of Professor Scheffel are not meant to accuse the Slovak Government, per se, of wrong-doing; but rather, to suggest that the case opened by the local government may be so unusual in many respects, that local prison officials and legal experts have difficulty in understanding the complexity in its context of authorized research combined with pressures from within the system to absolve the perpetrators of this false accusation.

Books

Svinia in Black and White: Slovak Roma and their Neighbours - revised edition (University of Toronto Press, 2009).
Roma Marginality/Romska Marginalita (Proceedings from conference “Assessment of marginality and integration among disadvantaged groups”), (editor). (Prešov, Slovakia 2004).
In the Shadow of Antichrist: The Old Believers of Alberta. (Peterborough, Ontario: Broadview Press, 1991).

.https://dennikn.sk/minuta/2035107/== References ==

.https://dennikn.sk/minuta/2035107/

Living people
Alumni of Pembroke College, Cambridge
Canadian anthropologists
McMaster University alumni
Memorial University of Newfoundland alumni
University of Manitoba alumni
Romani activists
Romani advocacy
Year of birth missing (living people)